Takaud Savings and Pensions B.S.C. is a specialist savings and pensions provider based in Bahrain. The company is licensed by the  Central Bank of Bahrain (CBB).

History 
Takaud Savings and Pensions B.S.C. was launched in 2011 and is considered the MENA region's specialist provider of savings and pensions.  It provides businesses as well as nationals and expatriates with investment and savings expertise that is specifically tailored for the GCC and wider Middle Eastern markets. TAKAUD offers investment through leading fund managers including BlackRock, JP Morgan, BNP, Dexia, Robeco, Franklin Templeton and Schroders.

Ownership 
TAKAUD is 50% owned by Kuwait Projects Company (Holding) K.S.C. (c) (KIPCO) and 50% by United Gulf Bank, a member of the KIPCO Group. The KIPCO Group is one of the biggest holding investment companies in the Middle East and North Africa, with consolidated assets of US$29 billion as at Q3 2013. It is licensed as an Investment Business Firm (Category 1) by the Central Bank of Bahrain (CBB), a closed joint stock company and is incorporated in the Kingdom of Bahrain.

References

External links 
Official website

2011 establishments in Bahrain
Financial services companies established in 2011
Companies of Bahrain